John "Jonjon" Hernandez Salvador (October 9, 1969 – November 7, 1993), also known as Jon Hernandez, was a Filipino notable actor. He was the son of actors Ross Rival and Alicia Alonzo, nephew to Anthony Alonzo, nephew to Phillip Salvador, cousin to Jobelle Salvador and brother to Maja Salvador on his father's side.

Career
As a child star, he appeared in minor roles in movies and several commercials. He was launched as a matinee idol, via the movie Bagets 2 along with William Martinez, Herbert Bautista, Raymond Lauchengco, JC Bonnin, Ramon Christopher and the late Francis Magalona. He joined the teen-variety show That's Entertainment and was a part of its Thursday group. In 1990s, he shifted to action movie genre, appeared in several action films like Nakaukit Na ang Lapida Mo, Junior Elvis, Pita, Terror ng Caloocan and Patapon. The last film he appeared in was Mancao with his uncle Phillip Salvador, which was post-humously shown and dedicated to his memory in 1994.

Filmography

Movies

Television

Death
After retiring from his showbiz career in 1993, Jonjon and his friends came home from an out-of-town trip. He died after the car he was riding in hit a concrete obstruction in an unlit section of the expressway. His remains are at rest at the Loyola Memorial Park together with other celebrities such as Julie Vega, Jay Ilagan, Nida Blanca and Francis Magalona.

References

External links
 

1969 births
1993 deaths
20th-century Filipino male actors
Filipino male child actors
That's Entertainment Thursday Group Members
Road incident deaths in the Philippines
That's Entertainment (Philippine TV series)
Jon
Burials at the Loyola Memorial Park
Filipino male film actors